Yusuke Momochi, better known as Momochi, is a Japanese professional fighting game player, particularly of ones in the Street Fighter series by Capcom. Momochi won the Capcom Cup 2014 championship, as well as winning the EVO 2015 title for Ultra Street Fighter IV.

Gaming career
Momochi played for Evil Geniuses up until his contract ended January 1, 2017 and was signed almost immediately by Team Echo Fox, along with former EG teammate Justin Wong and previously unsponsored Topanga partner Tokido. He is part of a team of three — consisting of fellow Japanese players RF and Kindevu — that took home first place at the 2010 Super Battle Opera tournament for Street Fighter 4. He also placed second at one of the final qualifiers for EVO 2011, Shadowloo Showdown. In 2011, Momochi signed with professional eSports team Evil Geniuses along with Ari "fLoE" Weintraub and Yuko "ChocoBlanka" Kusachi. In 2012, Momochi won the UK qualifier for the Street Fighter 25th Anniversary Grand Finals for Street Fighter III: 3rd Strike: Online Edition, Street Fighter X Tekken and Super Street Fighter IV: Arcade Edition v2012. Momochi would later receive 3rd, 5th, and 7th in the respective tournaments at the Street Fighter 25th Anniversary Grand Finals.

In 2014, Momochi qualified for the Capcom Cup by winning South East Asia Major and defeating fellow Japanese player Ryota "Kazunoko" Inoue. At EVO 2014, Momochi received 7th place in Ultra Street Fighter IV by being defeated by French Rose specialist, Olivier "Luffy" Hay in the beginning of Top 8 Losers. Momochi would later win the 2014 Capcom Cup by taking out Darryl "Snake Eyez" Lewis, being put into losers bracket by Ryan Hart, then completely dominated everyone in the bracket and defeated Ho "Xian" Kun Xian, in the Grand Finals. Because of this victory, Momochi was given the first qualifying spot in the 2015 Capcom Cup.

Momochi has been a contender in every Topanga A League tournament. Momochi currently holds 2nd place in the fourth Topanga A League and because of that, he has qualified for the fifth Topanga A League. Momochi is also in the 2nd Topanga World League.

Personal life
He currently lives along with Chocoblanka in Tokyo, Japan but was originally from Nagoya, Japan. Momochi is married to fellow fighting game player Yuko "ChocoBlanka" Kusachi. After Momochi won Capcom Cup 2014, he was thinking about taking ChocoBlanka to Disneyland. He is also a distant descendant of the famous Momochi ninja family of Iga.

Tournament results

References

External links
 Evil Geniuses profile

1986 births
Living people
People from Nagoya
Japanese esports players
Fighting game players
Evil Geniuses players
Echo Fox players
Team Razer players
Street Fighter players
Marvel vs. Capcom players